AWH may refer to:

 Albrighton Woodland Hunt, a United Kingdom fox hunt
 AWH (railway station), an Australian Easy Access railway station
 AWH Engineering College, a private Indian college